The WCW Cruiserweight Tag Team Championship was a title created in 2001 just prior to World Championship Wrestling (WCW) being sold to the World Wrestling Federation (WWF).

History
The WCW Cruiserweight Championship and the matches contested for that title had long been a unique feature on WCW programming. With the number of cruiserweights signed, it was decided to expand the visibility of the division, and create a tag team title for the cruiserweights in February 2001.

Tournament brackets

Reigns

References

See also 
WCW Cruiserweight Championship
WCW Women's Cruiserweight Championship

World Championship Wrestling championships
Cruiserweight wrestling championships
Tag team wrestling championships